Henri Banos (born 7 November 1913, date of death unknown) was a French rower. He competed in the men's single sculls event at the 1936 Summer Olympics.

References

1913 births
Year of death missing
French male rowers
Olympic rowers of France
Rowers at the 1936 Summer Olympics
Rowers from Paris